Camille Gutt (14 November 1884 – 7 June 1971), born Camille Guttenstein, was a Belgian economist, politician, and industrialist who served as the first managing director of the International Monetary Fund (IMF) from 1946 to 1951. He was the architect of a monetary reform plan that facilitated the recovery of the economy of Belgium after the Second World War.

Early life
Born in Brussels, he was a son of Max Guttenstein and Marie-Paule Schweitzer. Max Guttenstein had moved to Belgium from Austria-Hungary in 1877 and became a Belgian citizen in 1886. Camille Gutt attended high school at the Royal Athenaeum in Ixelles. Gutt obtained a PhD in legal studies, and a master's degree in political and social sciences at the Université Libre de Bruxelles (ULB). During his study, he met Claire Frick, whom he married in 1906. The marriage gave birth to three sons: Jean-Max (1914–1941), François (1916–1944) and Etienne (1922–2011).

Career
Camille Gutt worked in various industries, such as in the Société Générale de Belgique and Groupe Empain as well as politics. During World War I, Gutt worked for Georges Theunis and again from 1920 until 1924 as his Chief of Cabinet. Later, Gutt also worked for Emile Francqui. Camille Gutt was Minister of Finance of Belgium in 1934–1935 and 1939–1940, Minister of Finance, Economics and Traffic in 1940–1942, Minister of Finance and economics in 1942–1943, and Minister of Finance in 1943–1944 in the Belgian government in exile in London.

Gutt was responsible for saving the Belgian franc before and after World War II. Before the war, he saved the Belgian currency by secretly transferring the gold reserves of the Belgian National Bank out of Nazi reach. After the war, he stabilized the Belgian franc and forestalled inflation, with what still is known as the Gutt operation. Camille Gutt also played a major role in forging the Benelux, and by this contributed to the formation of the European Union.

Honours 
 : Grand Cordon in the Order of Leopold.
 : Knight Grand Cross in the Order of Orange-Nassau.
 :  Knight Grand Cross in the Order of the Oak Crown.
 Knight Grand Cross in the Order of Merit.
 :  Grand Officer in the Legion of Honour.

Selected publications
.
.

References

Further reading
 .
 .
.

External links
 IMF Archives
 United Nations Monetary and Financial Conference Final Act (Bretton Woods, New Hampshire 1 to 22 July 1944)
 

1884 births
1971 deaths
Belgian economists
20th-century Belgian lawyers
Belgian people of World War II
Belgian Ministers of State
Finance ministers of Belgium
Free University of Brussels (1834–1969) alumni
Managing directors of the International Monetary Fund
Members of the Belgian government in exile
Politicians from Brussels
Belgian officials of the United Nations
Belgian Protestants
Belgian people of Austrian descent
Belgian people of Jewish descent